Ellen Miller (1967–December 23, 2008) was an American fiction writer. She was born and raised in the Canarsie section of Brooklyn, New York, though lived in New York's East Village for the last 20 years of her life.

Miller's novel Like Being Killed was published in 1998 and appeared briefly on the San Francisco Chronicle bestseller list. Her fiction also appeared in the anthologies 110 Stories: New York Writes After September 11, Brooklyn Noir, and Lost Tribe: Jewish Fiction from the Edge. She was at work on a second, untitled novel at the time of her death.

She graduated from Wesleyan University, NYU Creative Writing Program, and the McDowell Colony and taught at NYU and the New School.

References

Writers from Brooklyn
2008 deaths
1967 births
American women novelists
20th-century American novelists
20th-century American women writers
Novelists from New York (state)
People from Canarsie, Brooklyn
People from the East Village, Manhattan
Wesleyan College alumni
New York University faculty
New York University alumni
American women academics
21st-century American women